

History
According to the research, Changzhou Big Magao was first created by the Mr. Wang Changxian (王长先) of the Changle Teahouse (长乐茶馆) during Xianfeng period in Qing Dynasty. It inherits for at least 150 years. It is a traditional food of Changzhou. It used to be the breakfast of the local citizens.

Feature
The shape of Changzhou Big Magao is oval. The surface is golden yellow. When you take a bite, it is fragrant, sweet, crumbly, mellow and delicious. The skin is thin, while the pastry is thick. There are several layers in one Changzhou Big Magao.

Developments
In the beginning, the size of Changzhou Magao was as big as today. Although the prize of it was inexpensive, the taste, the color and the smell was really good. When it came to the market, every customer liked this kind of dessert.
On the other hand, some people who worked labor-intensive were complaining about the small size of Changzhou Magao. One cannot feed the stomach enough, but carrying so many ones was hard for taking alone. They suggested making a bigger one by using the raw materials of the three original ones.
To satisfy these special customers’ request, the pastry cook changed the size of Changzhou Magao to be much bigger. The innovative ones were even much more popular than the initial ones. So Changzhou Magao is called Changzhou Big Magao.
Recoding by the Changzhou Government Record, in the late of Qing Dynasty and the beginning of the Republic of China, there were more than forty teahouses which sold Changzhou Big Magao in the Changzhou District.

Award
In 1983, Changzhou Big Magao was awarded as the Jiangsu Specialties.
In 1990, Changzhou Big Magao was elected as the one of Changzhou Ten Specialties.
In 2006, Changzhou Big Magao was recorded as the Jiangsu Well-known Dessert.
In 2008, Changzhou Big Magao was selected as the Changzhou non-material cultural heritage.

Raw Material
The raw material is provided for 50 pieces of Changzhou Big Magao. Changzhou Big Magao never makes one by one. Every time the Magao are put forty or fifty Magao into the oven as a group.
flour: 4.15 kg
baking powder: 600 gram
the white sesame seed without skin: 500 gram
dietary alkali: 25 gram
cerealose: 100 gram
refined salt: 50 gram
soft white sugar: 625 gram
diced green onion: 250 gram
pig lane leaf lard: 500 gram
lard stearin: 1.75 gram

References

Chinese cuisine